Aguiã is a freguesia ("civil parish") of Portugal, part of the concelho ("municipality") of Arcos de Valdevez, in the district of Viana do Castelo and the Norte region. The population in 2011 was 705, in an area of 3.81 km2.

References

Freguesias of Arcos de Valdevez